Tom Watson (April 1859 – 6 May 1915) was an English football manager who managed Sunderland and Liverpool around the turn of the 20th century. In winning the league title with both clubs—the first title for both—he was the first manager to do so with two clubs. Watson remains Liverpool's longest-serving manager, spending a total of nineteen years at the Merseyside club.

Early career
In 1881, Watson formed Newcastle upon Tyne-based club Rosehill. Being involved in local football, Watson played for local clubs Woodbine, Rosewood and Heaton. Prior to joining Sunderland, Watson was involved in a secretarial capacity at hometown clubs Newcastle West End and Newcastle East End. Acting as a general manager for both clubs, Watson helped Newcastle West End secure a lease of St James' Park, before resigning in December 1887 due to a crush at a game between Shankhouse, who had been loaned St James' Park, and Aston Villa. Watson later joined Newcastle East End in time for the 1888–89 season, where he continued to recruit Scottish international players, a tactic he had employed at West End.

Sunderland
Watson was in charge at Sunderland for six seasons from 1889–96. During this time, he led the club into the Football League. Under his guidance, Sunderland won three league championships in 1891–92, 1892–93 and 1894–95, making him the most successful manager in their history. Watson's Sunderland were declared the "Team of All Talents" by William McGregor, the founder of the league, after a 7–2 win against Aston Villa.

Liverpool

Watson moved to Liverpool in 1896, and enjoyed further success there until his death in 1915. Liverpool's longest-serving manager, during his nineteen years in charge he won the league on two occasions, in 1900–01 and 1905–06. Those were the first league titles in Liverpool history. He therefore became the first manager to lead two different clubs to the League Championship. There have been only three others since; Herbert Chapman, Brian Clough and Sir Kenny Dalglish. Watson also took Liverpool to their first FA Cup Final in 1914, which they lost 1–0 to Burnley.

Honours

As manager

Sunderland (1889–96)
Football League First Division
Winner: 1891–92, 1892–93, 1894–95
Runner-up: 1893–94

Liverpool (1896–1915)
Football League First Division
Winner: 1900–01, 1905–06
Runner-up: 1898–99, 1909–1910
Football League Second Division
Winner: 1904–05
FA Cup
Runner-up: 1913–14
Sheriff of London Charity Shield
Winner: 1906–07

See also 
 List of English football championship winning managers

References

External links
Manager profile at LFChistory.net

1859 births
1915 deaths
Sportspeople from Newcastle upon Tyne
English footballers
English football managers
Liverpool F.C. managers
Sunderland A.F.C. managers
Association footballers not categorized by position